Jonathan Jimenez (born 17 December 1997) is a Trinidadian footballer who plays for Florida Premier FC in the United Premier Soccer League and for the Tampa Bay Strikers in the National Indoor Soccer League.

Career

Youth and college 
Jimenez played two years of college soccer at Seton Hall University between 2016 and 2017, before transferring to the University of the Pacific in California in 2018. At Seton Hall Jimenez played 29 games, scoring 4 goals and tallying 9 assists. At Pacific, Jimenez made 21 appearances, scored 8 goals and tallied 5 assists.

While at college, Jimenez appeared for USL League Two sides Lakeland Tropics in 2017, and Portland Timbers U23s during their 2018 and 2019 seasons.

Professional 
On 9 January 2020, Jimenez was selected 26th overall in the 2020 MLS SuperDraft by Chicago Fire. However, he did not sign with the club.

On 9 July 2020, Jimenez joined USL Championship side Rio Grande Valley FC. He made his debut on 19 July 2020, appearing as an 82nd-minute substitute in a 1–1 draw with San Antonio FC. Rio Grande Valley opted to decline Jimenez's contract option following their 2020 season.

International career 
Jimenez was called up to the Trinidad & Tobago national team for their friendly game on 31 January 2021 against the United States.

Personal life
His parents are from Trinidad and Costa Rica.

References

External links 
 
 Jonathan Jimenez – Men's Soccer Seton Hall bio
 Jonathan Jimenez – 2018 – Men's Soccer Pacific bio
 

1997 births
Living people
American soccer players
Association football defenders
Chicago Fire FC draft picks
Lakeland Tropics players
Pacific Tigers men's soccer players
People from Cape Coral, Florida
Portland Timbers U23s players
Rio Grande Valley FC Toros players
Seton Hall Pirates men's soccer players
Soccer players from Florida
USL Championship players
United Premier Soccer League players
Trinidad and Tobago footballers
Trinidad and Tobago international footballers
American sportspeople of Trinidad and Tobago descent
American people of Costa Rican descent
USL League Two players